The table below shows a list of South Australia's 20 largest schools by enrolment size in 2006, 2016 and 2018.
This student enrolment information is based on current and historic information from the MySchool website and its predecessors.

See also
List of schools in South Australia
tatachilla 1138

References

Schools in South Australia
Schools
Lists of schools in South Australia
South Australian Schools
Lists of education-related superlatives